Shaheed Benazir Bhutto University of Veterinary & Animal Sciences, Shaheed Benazirabad or SBBUVAS is Public Degree-awarding Institution located at Nawabshah, Pakistan.

Location 
The main Campus of the Shaheed Benazir Bhutto Veterinary And Animal Science University was located in Sakrand City, district Shaheed Benazirabad. Recently government plan to upgrade it but land can't available in the surrounding area then government shifting or establishing it in new area out of city near Aliabad Cadet College Road Nawabshah.

See also
 Shaheed Benazir Bhutto City University in Karachi
 Shaheed Benazir Bhutto Dewan University in Karachi
 Benazir Bhutto Shaheed University (Karachi) in Karachi, Sindh
 Shaheed Benazir Bhutto University (Sheringal) in Dir, Khyber Pakhtunkhwa
 Shaheed Benazir Bhutto University (Shaheed Benazirabad) in Shaheed Benazirabad, Sindh
 Shaheed Benazir Bhutto Women University in Peshawar, Khyber Pakhtunkhwa
 Shaheed Mohtarma Benazir Bhutto Medical University in Larkana, Sindh
 Medical Colleges
 Mohtarma Benazir Bhutto Shaheed Medical College
 Shaheed Benazir Bhutto Medical College
 Law Colleges
Shaheed Benazir Bhutto Law College

Public universities and colleges in Sindh
Veterinary schools in Pakistan
Memorials to Benazir Bhutto